Common law copyright is the legal doctrine that grants copyright protection based on common law of various jurisdictions, rather than through protection of statutory law.

In part, it is based on the contention that copyright is a natural right and creators are therefore entitled to the same protections anyone would be in regard to tangible and real property.  The proponents of this doctrine contended that creators had a perpetual right to control the publication of their work (also see perpetual copyright).

The "natural right" aspect of the doctrine was addressed by the courts in the United Kingdom (Donaldson v. Beckett, 1774) and the United States (Wheaton v. Peters, 1834). In both countries, the courts found that copyright is a limited right under statutes and subject to the conditions and terms the legislature sees fit to impose. The decision in the UK did not, however, directly rule on whether copyright was a common-law right.

In the United States, common law copyright also refers to state-level copyrights.  These are ordinarily preempted by federal copyright law, but for some categories of works, common law (state) copyright may be available.  For instance, in the New York State 2005 case, Capitol Records v. Naxos of America, the court held that pre-1972 sound recordings, which do not receive federal copyrights, may nevertheless receive state common law copyrights, a ruling that was clarified and limited with 2016's Flo & Eddie v. Sirius XM Radio.

Battle of the booksellers (UK) 
Until the enactment of the Statute of Anne publishers could pass on their royal grants of copyright to their heirs in perpetuity. When the statutory copyright term provided for by the Statute of Anne began to expire in 1731 London booksellers thought to defend their dominant position by seeking injunctions from the Court of Chancery for works by authors that fell outside the statute's protection. At the same time the London booksellers lobbied parliament to extend the copyright term provided by the Statute of Anne. Eventually, in a case known as Midwinter v. Hamilton (1743–1748), the London booksellers turned to common law and starting a 30-year period known as the battle of the booksellers. The battle of the booksellers saw London booksellers locking horns with the newly emerging Scottish book trade over the right to reprint works falling outside the protection of the Statute of Anne. The Scottish booksellers argued that no common law copyright existed in an author's work. The London booksellers argued that the Statute of Anne only supplemented and supported a pre-existing common law copyright. The dispute was argued out in a number of notable cases, including Millar v. Kincaid (1749–1751) and Tonson v. Collins (1761).

When Donaldson v Beckett reached the House of Lords in 1774 only one Lord, Thomas Lyttelton, spoke in favour of common law copyright. But a majority of the judges who were consulted by the Lords spoke in favour of common law copyright. Lord Camden was most strident in his rejection of the common law copyright, warning the Lords that should they vote in favour of common law copyright, effectively a perpetual copyright, "all our learning will be locked up in the hands of the Tonsons and the Lintots of the age". Moreover, he warned that booksellers would then set upon books whatever price they pleased "till the public became as much their slaves, as their own hackney compilers are". He declared that "[t]his perpetuity now contended for is as odious and as selfish as any other, it deserves as much reprobation, and will become as intolerable. Knowledge and science are not things to be bound in such cobweb chains." The House of Lords ultimately ruled that copyright in published works was subject to the durational limits of the statute. The reasoning behind the decision is disputed, though most scholars agree that the House did not rule against common-law copyright.

The Lords agreed that an author had a pre-existing right "to dispose of his manuscript ... until he parts with it" (Lord Chief Justice De Grey), but that prior to the Statute of Anne the right to copy was "founded on patents, privileges, Star Chamber Decrees and the bylaws of the Stationers' Company" (Lord Camden). In any event, they determined, the Statute of Anne superseded any common law rights of the author which may have existed prior to the statute. The previous entry here maintained that the Lords found that "parliament had limited these natural rights in order to strike a more appropriate balance between the interests of the author and the wider social good," quoting Ronan. However, the use of the phrase "natural rights" is not justified by the historical record. Lord Chief Baron Smythe stated that the Statute of Anne was "a compromise between authors and printers contending for a perpetuity, and those who denied them any statute right," but the Lords in no way accepted that such a common law or 'natural' right of the author in perpetuity ever existed or developed. Lord Chief Justice De Grey saw no evidence of any such right in the courts in the 300 years since the invention of the printing press and charged that "the idea of a common-law right [of the author] in perpetuity was not taken up till after that failure in procuring a new statute for an enlargement of the term."

According to Patterson and Livingston there remains confusion about the nature of copyright ever since the Donaldson case. Copyright has come to be viewed as a natural law right of the author as well as the statutory grant of a limited monopoly. One theory holds that copyright's origin occurs at the creation of a work, the other that it origin exists only through the copyright statute.

Wheaton v. Peters (US) 

In 1834 the Supreme Court ruled in Wheaton v. Peters, a case similar to the British Donaldson v Beckett of 1774, that although the author of an unpublished work had a common law right to control the first publication of that work, the author did not have a common law right to control reproduction following the first publication of the work.

State law copyright claims 
Common law copyright is also the term used in the United States to refer to most state law copyright claims.  In 1978, Section 301 took effect, preempting all state common law copyright claims that fall under subject matter in Section 102 (Subject matter of copyright: In general) or Section 103 (Subject matter of copyright: Compilations and derivative works) except for sound recordings fixed before February 15, 1972. This leaves a sizable amount of work that still falls under a mixture of state statutes and common law copyright.

Most state-law copyright claims are preempted by federal copyright law, but for some categories of works, common law (state) copyright may be available.  For instance, in the New York State 2005 case, Capitol Records v. Naxos of America, the court held that pre-1972 sound recordings, which do not receive federal copyrights, may nevertheless receive state common law copyrights. This precedent was partially overruled in 2016 in Flo & Eddie Inc. v. Sirius XM Radio, which determined that the extent of common law copyright in New York did not cover the performance of a sound recording.

See also 
Copyright Act of 1909
Gyles v Wilcox

References

Copyright law
Common law